John Fyfe may refer to:

John Fyfe (footballer) (1873–1950), Scottish footballer
John K. Fyfe, United States Navy submarine commander in World War II
John William Fyfe (1839–?), American physician